Sai Pan Pha (born 12 July 1977) is a Burmese politician who serves as a House of Nationalities member of parliament for Kayah State № 12 constituency. He is a member of the National League for Democracy.

Early life and education 
He was born on 12 July 1977 in Loikaw, Kayah State, Myanmar. He is an ethnic Karen. He graduated with B.A. (geography) from distance education at Taunggyi University. His former work is trader. He is a former member of the Union Solidarity and Development Party from 1998 to 2010.

Political career
He is a member of the National League for Democracy, he was elected as an Amyotha Hluttaw representative from Kayah State № 12 parliamentary constituency.

References

1977 births
Living people
People from Kayah State
Burmese people of Karen descent
Members of the House of Nationalities
Union Solidarity and Development Party politicians
National League for Democracy politicians